Mission Township may refer to: 

Mission Township, LaSalle County, Illinois
Mission Township, Brown County, Kansas
Mission Township, Neosho County, Kansas
Mission Township, Shawnee County, Kansas, in Shawnee County, Kansas
Mission Township, Crow Wing County, Minnesota
Mission Township, Benson County, North Dakota
Mission Township, Corson County, South Dakota, in Corson County, South Dakota

Township name disambiguation pages